Douglas James Wilkie (born 25 September 1956) is a Scottish retired football left winger who made over 100 appearances in the Scottish League for Queen's Park.

References

Scottish footballers
Scottish Football League players
Queen's Park F.C. players
Association football wingers
1956 births
Footballers from Glasgow
Living people
Dundee United F.C. players